Jahanian, (Punjabi ), is an administrative subdivision, tehsil, of Khanewal District in the Punjab province of Pakistan. The city of Jahanian is the headquarters of the tehsil.

The languages spoken in the tehsil are Urdu, Punjabi, Saraiki, Mewati, and Haryanvi.

References

Tehsils of Punjab, Pakistan
Khanewal District